Peter Luczak and Yuri Schukin were the defending champions, but they didn't participate.
João Sousa and Leonardo Tavares won the doubles title, defeating Andis Juška and Deniss Pavlovs 7–6(3), 7–5 in the final.

Seeds

Draw

Draw

References
 Doubles Draw
 Qualifying Draw

Tampere Open - Doubles
Tampere Open